Nueva Granada is a town and municipality of the Magdalena Department in northern Colombia.

References

External links
 Gobernacion del Magdalena - Nueva Granada

Municipalities of Magdalena Department